Pavle Omčikus (1912—1942), nicknamed Pajo or Pajica, was a leader of the Serbian rebels during the July 1941 Srb uprising in the Independent State of Croatia. He later commanded the royalist Chetnik Regiment "King Peter II" and collaborated with Italian occupiers. He was killed in Partisan custody in March 1942.

Early life 
Pavle Omčikus was born in 1912 in Srb in the Kingdom of Croatia-Slavonia. His father was named Gajo, and his mother Marija. Omčikus' family was well known in the region, as Pavle's father and grandfather were presidents of a Serb municipality. Omčikus completed elementary school in Srb and a gymnasium in Gospić. He served in the Royal Yugoslav Army in Meljine in Kotor Bay from 1933 to 1934. He was a supporter of the social liberal Independent Democratic Party, but later joined the far-right Yugoslav Radical Union.

World War II

Uprising 
At the beginning of the Srb uprising, Omčikus—together with Pera Rajak, Miloš Torbica, and other rebels—attacked Srb and destroyed the Ustaše garrison. Omčikus organized the use of trucks to transport rebels to front-line positions.

In August 1941, the Chetnik Regiment "King Peter II" was established in Lika; and Omčikus was appointed as its commander. He publicly disagreed with communist leaders in Lika, accusing them of being responsible for political division among Serbs.

Italian assistance 
Italy used the uprising as an excuse to attempt to expand the territory of the Independent State of Croatia (NDH) under Italian control deeper into western Bosnia. Chetnik leaders Omčikus, Radjenović, and Major Rašeta claimed that the Italians would save the Serbs from being terrorized by the Ustasha; and that the Italians should be welcomed as liberators. On 26 August 1941, the NDH and Italy agreed that the Second Italian Army would occupy and pacify rebels in the second and third zones. Italy supported Serb rebels in helping to establish Italian influence beyond the zones they occupied per formal agreements.

Death 
Some post-war communist sources emphasized that Omčikus surrendered to the communist-led Partisans with the intention of joining them. Voivode Momčilo Đujić, who was commander of Yugoslav Chetnik forces in Lika, sent an ultimatum to communists to release Omčikus.

Some communist sources claimed that Omčikus committed suicide in a communist-held prison in Krbavica, while contemporary communist reports stated that Omčikus and a group of 30 Yugoslav Chetniks were captured and murdered by communists.

Objectives of the Dinara Division 
The leaders of the Serb rebels who belonged to Chetnik units of the Dinara Division agreed on the basic principles of their further struggle. This was presented in a document composed between 8 and 12 March 1942 and was titled "Elaborat of Dinara Division". The main objective of their struggle of establishing a Serb nation-state was stipulated in detail, and signed by Momčilo Đujić, Pavle Popović, Pavle Omčikus, Branko Bogunović, and Mane Rokvić. On the other hand, the Croatian Communist forces undertook all necessary measures to destroy any attempt to establish a Serbian nation-state by the "murders of national leaders and Chetniks" and waging against them "a war until extreme limits of life".

References

Sources 

 
 
 
 
 

Sources published in Yugoslavia during communist rule
 
 
 
 
 
 
 

1912 births
1942 deaths
Chetnik personnel of World War II
People killed by Yugoslav Partisans
Royal Yugoslav Army personnel